William Jennings Bryan Dorn (April 14, 1916 – August 13, 2005) was a United States politician from South Carolina who represented the western part of the state in the United States House of Representatives from 1947 to 1949 and from 1951 to 1975 as a Democrat.

Early life
Dorn was born near Greenwood, South Carolina on April 14, 1916, the son of Thomas Elbert and Pearl Griffith Dorn. Thomas Dorn was a school teacher, principal, and superintendent who hoped his son would have a political career, so he named the boy after William Jennings Bryan. Bryan Dorn attended the public schools of Greenwood and Greenwood High School, and became a farmer.  He attended the University of South Carolina where he was a member of the Clariosophic Society.  He was elected to the South Carolina House of Representatives in 1938 and to the South Carolina Senate in 1940. He served in the United States Army Air Forces in Europe during World War II.

Congressional career
Dorn was first elected to Congress in the 1946 election. In the 1948 election, he unsuccessfully challenged incumbent U.S. Senator Burnet R. Maybank for the Democratic nomination.  Maybank won the nomination, and was unopposed in the general election.

Dorn returned to the House in the 1950 election, and became known for his work on issues related to the military and the expansion of civil rights. He was a signatory to the 1956 Southern Manifesto that opposed the desegregation of public schools ordered by the Supreme Court in Brown v. Board of Education.

In 1966, journalist Drew Pearson reported that Dorn was one of a group of Congressman who had received the "Statesman of the Republic" award from Liberty Lobby for his "right-wing activities".  In his final term he was chairman of the House Veterans' Affairs Committee.

Candidacy for governor

He left Congress to run for Governor of South Carolina in 1974. He lost the Democratic primary to Charles 'Pug' Ravenel, who the South Carolina Supreme Court later ruled ineligible on residency grounds required by the state constitution.  A special state convention then chose Dorn as the Democratic candidate.  He was defeated in the general election by Republican James B. Edwards, one of the few disappointments in what was generally a big year for Democrats. In 1978, Dorn again sought the Democratic nomination for governor but was eliminated in a three-way race won by Richard Riley.  In 1980, he was elected chairman of the South Carolina Democratic Party, and he served until 1984.

After Congress
In 1978, President Jimmy Carter named the Columbia, South Carolina, Veteran's Affairs Hospital after Dorn as the "William Jennings Bryan Dorn Veterans' Hospital." Dorn died in Greenwood on August 13, 2005.  He was buried at Bethel Methodist Church Cemetery in Callison, Greenwood County, South Carolina.

Autobiography
Dorn, William Jennings Bryan, and Scott Derks. Dorn: Of the People, A Political Way of Life. Columbia and Orangeburg, S.C.: Bruccoli Clark Layman/Sandlapper Publishing, 1988

References

External links

 
 William Jennings Bryan Dorn: In His Own Words Audio clips from the Papers of William Jennings Bryan Dorn at South Carolina Political Collections* William Jennings Bryan Dorn Papers at the University of South Carolina at South Carolina Political Collections

|-

1916 births
2005 deaths
People from Greenwood, South Carolina
United States Army Air Forces personnel of World War II
Democratic Party members of the United States House of Representatives from South Carolina
20th-century American politicians
People from Greenwood County, South Carolina
United States Army Air Forces non-commissioned officers
Old Right (United States)
American segregationists